Usil is the Etruscan god of the sun. This name appears on the bronze liver of Piacenza, next to Tiur, the moon. Another iconic depiction features Usil rising out of the sea, with a fireball in either outstretched hand, on an engraved Etruscan bronze mirror in late Archaic style, formerly on the Roman antiquities market. On Etruscan mirrors in Classical style, Usil appears with a halo.

Usil has been syncretised with the Roman Sol and Greek Helios. However, while Usil is depicted as male in some artwork, there are also feminine depictions. In particular, there is a possible equation with another indigenous Etruscan goddess, Catha, which is often interpreted as having a solar character. In artwork Usil is shown in close association with Thesan, the dawn goddess, something almost never seen with Helios and Eos.

See also
 List of solar deities

References

Etruscan mythology
Solar gods